The Artios Award for Outstanding Achievement in Comedy Pilot Casting is an award handed out annually by the Casting Society of America. It was introduced at the Art Directors Guilds' twelfth annual honors, in 1996 (honoring work from the previous year, as well as early months of the ceremony's year), after first being grouped together with casting for dramatic pilot episodes for the category Outstanding Achievement in Pilot Casting, which was introduced at the seventh annual awards in 1991. It is an award that is given to casting directors for their work on television pilot episodes, or a series first episode.

Winners and nominations

1990s
Outstanding Achievement in Pilot Casting

Outstanding Achievement in Comedy Pilot Casting

2000s

2010s

Reference

American television awards
Casting awards